Emiliano Moretti  (born 11 June 1981) is an Italian former professional footballer who played as a centre back.

He began his career at Lodigiani and was signed by Fiorentina in 1998. In March 2001 he made his debut in Serie A under Roberto Mancini, before spending periods at Juventus, Modena, Parma and Bologna. In 2004, he was signed by Spaniards Valencia, where he won the Copa del Rey in 2007–08. In 2009, he returned to Italy where he spent four seasons with Genoa. In August 2013, he was signed by Torino, where he remained until his retirement in 2019, having collected over 600 career appearances at club level.

Internationally, Moretti represented Italy at under-16 and under-20 youth levels. He was also part of the under-21 team that won the UEFA European Under-21 Championship and a bronze medal at the 2004 Summer Olympics. On 18 November 2014, at the age of 33, he became the oldest player to debut for the Italy national football team, playing as a starter in a friendly against Albania. In total, he collected 2 appearances for Italy at senior level between 2014 and 2015.

Club career

Early career
Moretti started his career with local club Lodigiani, and in 1998 transferred to Fiorentina. He made his Serie A debut in March 2001, and was a member of the team that won the 2001 Coppa Italia. In the 2001–02 season, he played in 27 matches. Right before the Fiorentina bankruptcy, Moretti moved to Juventus in June 2002 for a fee of €2.6 million, and was loaned to Modena to help them avoid relegation. In 2003, Parma signed Moretti for €1.8 million (part of Stephen Appiah's €2 million loan), loaning him to Serie A team Bologna. In 2004, with Parma facing financial problems and Claudio Ranieri becoming head coach of Valencia, the left defender was traded to Valencia.

Valencia
In the summer of 2004 he was transferred outright to Spanish club Valencia, who had already purchased fellow Italians Bernardo Corradi, Marco Di Vaio and Stefano Fiore. On 27 August, while remaining on the bench, he was part of the team that won the UEFA Super Cup, beating Porto 2–1. Claudio Ranieri would use Moretti predominantly at left-back, and, despite a difficult start due to competition with Fábio Aurélio and compatriot Amedeo Carboni, would soon earn the starting spot. He scored his first goal for Valencia on 28 November 2004 in the Primera División in a 2–0 home win against Mallorca. In the Champions League he played 4 games against Inter Milan, Werder Bremen and Anderlecht, with 29 appearances during the season.

The following season, he was a starter, making 33 appearances and a decisive contribution to the achievement of a third-place finish. At the beginning of the following season, on 6 November 2006, in the match against Espanyol, Moretti was seriously injured, damaging his lateral ligament of the knee, forcing him to the sidelines for more than three months. Despite the injury, the season remained one of the most important on a personal level and as a team, which reached the quarter-finals of the Champions League, defeated only by Chelsea. Moretti ended the year with 34 total appearances.

The 2007–08 season was not as positive, which concluded with Valencia tenth. Moretti remained a protagonist of the side, leading to Valencia's victory on 16 April 2008 in the 2008 Copa del Rey Final, playing all the matches from the initial stage to the final.

The following season, he was still a starter in the Spanish side, which reached the first knockout round of the UEFA Cup, which concludes the year sixth place in the Primera División. Moretti disputed 32 games.

Genoa
After 172 appearances and 4 goals with the Spanish club, he returned to Italy to play for Genoa, engaged in the Europa League. The transfer fee was €3.5 million, according to Genoa.

He made his debut for Genoa on 23 August 2009, a 3–2 victory at home against Roma. A week later he scored his first goal in red and blue colours against Atalanta. His first season with the Grifoni finished with 37 appearances and 1 goal in total. The following year, he only made 18 appearances under Gian Piero Gasperini, while the team finished the season in tenth place. The 2011–12 season is even more difficult for the team, and despite 27 appearances and a goal (against Inter Milan), Genoa finished in fourth last position. He was confirmed part of the Genoa defence for the 2012–13 season, contributing 33 total appearances.

On 5 May 2013, he celebrated his hundredth appearances in Serie A with the shirt of Genoa, on the occasion of a match ending 4–1 against Pescara.

Torino

After being close to a renewal with Genoa, on 11 July 2013 he was signed by Torino on a free transfer, on a two-year contract. He made his competitive debut for the Granata on 17 August, in Coppa Italia against Pescara. He scored his first official goal for Torino on 24 December in a 4–1 win against Catania. At the end of the season he extended his contract until 2016.

On 25 January 2015, he scored a goal in the 94th minute in which Torino defeated Inter Milan at San Siro after 27 years. It was his second goal for Torino.

On 30 August, he scored his first goal of the 2015–16 season, the equaliser in a 3–1 home win against Fiorentina. On 25 November, his contract was renewed until 2017. On 2 April 2017, he scored his first goal of the 2016–17 season in a 2–2 home draw against Udinese. On 5 April, his contract was renewed until 2018.

On 26 May 2019, he made his last appearance for Torino and of his football career, coming on as a substitute for Armando Izzo, and helped Torino beat Lazio 3–1 at home, after which he retired from professional football; in total, he collected over 600 career appearances at club level

International career
Moretti was in Italy's squad in the 1998 UEFA European Under-16 Championship, which the Azzurrini lost to Republic of Ireland in the final. With the under-21, he won the UEFA European Under-21 Football Championship and a bronze medal at the 2004 Summer Olympics football tournament.

On 9 November 2014, he was called up to the senior national team by Antonio Conte ahead of a UEFA Euro 2016 qualifying match against Croatia and a friendly against Albania. On 18 November, he was deployed as a starter in Genoa during a 1–0 win against Albania, becoming, at 33 years, 5 months and 7 days, the oldest player to debut for Italy. He made his second and final appearance for Italy a 1–1 friendly draw against England in Turin on 31 March 2015.

Style of play
A naturally left-footed defender, Moretti was originally an attacking left-back, but throughout his career he has often been used as a central defender. He is noted for his physicality, good positional sense, excellent technique, and ability in the air.

Career statistics

Club

International

Honours
Fiorentina
 Coppa Italia: 2000–01

Juventus
 Supercoppa Italiana: 2002
 Serie A: 2002–03

Valencia
 UEFA Super Cup: 2004
 Copa del Rey: 2007–08

Italy U21
 UEFA European Under-21 Championship: 2004
 Olympic bronze: 2004

Orders
 5th Class / Knight: Cavaliere Ordine al Merito della Repubblica Italiana: 2004

References

External links
 

FIGC  
Stats. at Voetbal International 
 

Living people
1981 births
Footballers from Rome
Association football fullbacks
Italian footballers
A.S. Lodigiani players
ACF Fiorentina players
Juventus F.C. players
Modena F.C. players
Parma Calcio 1913 players
Bologna F.C. 1909 players
Genoa C.F.C. players
Torino F.C. players
Valencia CF players
Serie A players
Serie C players
La Liga players
Olympic bronze medalists for Italy
Olympic footballers of Italy
Footballers at the 2004 Summer Olympics
Italy under-21 international footballers
Italian expatriate footballers
Expatriate footballers in Spain
Italian expatriate sportspeople in Spain
Olympic medalists in football
Medalists at the 2004 Summer Olympics
Italy international footballers
Italy youth international footballers
Knights of the Order of Merit of the Italian Republic